General elections were held in Botswana on 26 October 1974. With 205,050 registered voters, turnout was just 31.22%. The result was a third successive landslide victory for the Botswana Democratic Party (BDP), who won 27 of the 32 elected seats, including four in which they were unopposed. Local elections were held on the same day, with a turnout of just 30.3%, and saw the BDP strengthen its position.

Campaign
A total of 63 candidates contested the elections. The BDP ran a full slate of 32 candidates, the Botswana National Front had 14 candidates, the Botswana People's Party had eight, the Botswana Independence Party had six, and there were three independents.

Results

References

Elections in Botswana
1974 in Botswana
Botswana
Election and referendum articles with incomplete results